Donna McGovern ( Procter, born 16 October 1969) is a retired Australian butterfly and medley swimmer. She competed in three events at the 1988 Summer Olympics.

References

External links
 

1969 births
Living people
Australian female butterfly swimmers
Australian female medley swimmers
Olympic swimmers of Australia
Swimmers at the 1988 Summer Olympics
Place of birth missing (living people)
Commonwealth Games medallists in swimming
Commonwealth Games bronze medallists for Australia
Swimmers at the 1990 Commonwealth Games
20th-century Australian women
21st-century Australian women
Medallists at the 1990 Commonwealth Games